Sanford Greene is a comics artist. He worked for publishers like Marvel, Dark Horse, Image and DC Comics. He created the webcomic 1000 (written by Chuck Brown) and Bitter Root (co-written by Brown and David F. Walker). Greene already won Eisner and Ringo Awards.

References

Webtoon creators
1972 births
Living people